In enzymology, a homoserine O-succinyltransferase is an enzyme that catalyzes the chemical reaction

succinyl-CoA + L-homoserine  CoA + O-succinyl-L-homoserine

Thus, the two substrates of this enzyme are succinyl-CoA and L-homoserine, whereas its two products are CoA and O-succinyl-L-homoserine.

This enzyme belongs to the family of transferases, specifically those acyltransferases transferring groups other than aminoacyl groups.  The systematic name of this enzyme class is succinyl-CoA:L-homoserine O-succinyltransferase. Other names in common use include homoserine O-transsuccinylase, and homoserine succinyltransferase.  This enzyme participates in methionine metabolism and sulfur metabolism.

Structural studies

References 

 

EC 2.3.1
Enzymes of known structure